Belgica Mountains is an isolated chain of mountains about  long, standing  east-southeast of the Sor Rondane Mountains in Queen Maud Land, in the Antarctic. The chain was discovered by the Belgian Antarctic Expedition (1957-1958) under Gaston de Gerlache, and named after the ship Belgica, commanded by his father, Lt. Adrien de Gerlache, leader of the Belgian Antarctic Expedition of 1897–99.

List of mountains 
 Mount Bastin – A mountain standing 1 nautical mile (1.9 km) north of Mount Perov. Discovered by the Belgian Antarctic Expedition who named it for Captain Frank Bastin, who assisted in the scientific preparation of the expedition.
 Mount Boë – A mountain standing 1 nautical mile (1.9 km) northeast of Mount Victor. Discovered by the Belgian Antarctic Expedition, 1957–58, under G. de Gerlache, who named it for Captain Sigmund Boë, commander of the ship Polarhav, which transported the expedition.
 Mount Brouwer –  A mountain between Mount Hoge and Mount Launoit. Discovered by the Belgian Antarctic Expedition, 1957–58, who named it for Carl de Brouwer, a patron of the expedition.
 Mount Gillet –  A mountain standing just north of Mount Van der Essen.  Discovered by the Belgian Antarctic Expedition, 1957–58, who named it for Charles Gillet, a patron of the expedition.
 Mount Hoge –  A mountain between Mount Van der Essen and Mount Brouwer. Discovered by the Belgian Antarctic Expedition, 1957–58, who named it for Edmond Hoge, member of the scientific committee of the expedition.
 Mount Imbert –  A mountain standing close northeast of Mount Launoit in the east part of the mountain range. Discovered by the Belgian Antarctic Expedition, 1957–58, who named it for Bertrand Imbert, leader of the French Antarctic Expedition, 1956–57.
 Mount Launoit –  A mountain between Mount Brouwer and Mount Imbert. Discovered by the Belgian Antarctic Expedition, 1958–59,  who named it for Count de Launoit, President of the BRUFINA Society which gave financial assistance to the expedition.
It was discovered by the Belgian Antarctic Expedition, 1957–58, under G. de Gerlache, who named it for Count Charles of Limburg Stirum, a patron of the expedition.
 Mount Perov –  A mountain just west of the terminus of Norsk Polarinstitutt Glacier. Discovered by the Belgian Antarctic Expedition, 1957–58, who named it for Commander V. Perov, Soviet pilot who came to the aid of four members of the Belgian Antarctic Expedition in December 1958.
 Mount Van Mieghem –  A mountain standing 1 mi south of Mount Perov. Discovered by the Belgian Antarctic Expedition, 1957–58, who named it for Prof. Jacques Van Mieghem, president of the scientific committee of the expedition.
 Mount Van der Essen –  A mountain just south of Mount Gillet. Discovered by the Belgian Antarctic Expedition, 1957–58, who named it for Alfred Van der Essen, director at the Ministry of Foreign Affairs and a patron of the expedition.
 Mount Victor –  A mountain between Mount Van Mieghem and Mount Boe. It was discovered by the Belgian Antarctic Expedition, 1957–58, who named it for the French polar explorer Paul-Émile Victor, a counselor of the expedition.

References

Mountain ranges of Queen Maud Land